Alishewanella agri is a Gram-negative, aerobic, rod-shaped and non-motile bacterium from the genus of Alishewanella which has been isolated from landfill soil.

References

Bacteria described in 2010
Alteromonadales